Onyx Summit is a mountain pass located in the San Bernardino Mountains in the southwestern part of San Bernardino County, California, United States. At an elevation of 8,443 ft. (2,573 m), it is the highest mountain pass in Southern California. California State Route 38 traverses it at postmile 39.37 in the eastern part of San Bernardino National Forest.

See also
List of mountain passes in California

References
 http://www.waymarking.com/waymarks/WM28RN waymarking.com
 http://www.dot.ca.gov/hq/tsip/tsidoc/summit.xls Caltrans

Mountain passes of California
Landforms of San Bernardino County, California